In number theory, a pseudoprime is called an elliptic pseudoprime for (E, P), where E is an elliptic curve defined over the field of rational numbers with complex multiplication by an order in , having equation y2 = x3 + ax + b with a, b integers, P being a point on E and n a natural number such that the Jacobi symbol (−d | n) = −1, if .

The number of elliptic pseudoprimes less than X is bounded above, for large X, by

References

External links
 

Pseudoprimes